Vincent Ludwig Persichetti (June 6, 1915 – August 14, 1987) was an American composer, teacher, and pianist. An important musical educator and writer, he was known for his integration of various new ideas in musical composition into his own work and teaching, as well as for training many noted composers in composition at the Juilliard School.

His students at Juilliard included Philip Glass, Steve Reich, Larry Thomas Bell, Bruce Adolphe, Louis Calabro, Moshe Cotel, Michael Jeffrey Shapiro, Laurie Spiegel, Kenneth Fuchs, Richard Danielpour, Lawrence Dillon, Peter Schickele, Lowell Liebermann, Robert Witt, Elena Ruehr, William Schimmel, Leonardo Balada, Gitta Steiner, Hank Beebe, Roland Wiggins, Randell Croley and Leo Brouwer. He also taught composition to Joseph Willcox Jenkins and conductor James DePreist at the Philadelphia Conservatory.

Life
Persichetti was born in Philadelphia, Pennsylvania, in 1915. Though neither of his parents was a musician, his musical education began early. Persichetti enrolled in the Combs College of Music at the age of five, where he studied piano, organ, double bass and later music theory and composition with Russel King Miller, whom he considered a great influence.

He first performed his original works publicly at the age of 14. By the time he reached his teens, Persichetti was paying for his own education by accompanying and performing. He continued to do so throughout high school, adding church organist, orchestral player and radio staff pianist to his experience. In addition to developing his musical talents, he attended art school and remained an avid sculptor until his death. He attended Combs for his undergraduate education as well. After receiving a bachelor's degree in 1936, he was immediately offered a teaching position.

By the age of 20, Persichetti was simultaneously head of the theory and composition department at Combs, a conducting major with Fritz Reiner at the Curtis Institute, and a student of piano (with Olga Samaroff) and composition at the Philadelphia Conservatory. He earned a master's degree in 1941 and a doctorate in 1945 from the Conservatory, as well as a conducting diploma from Curtis. In 1941, while still a student, Persichetti headed the theory and composition department as well as the department of postgraduate study at Philadelphia Conservatory.

In 1941 Persichetti married Dorothea Flanagan who was a composer as well. They had a daughter named Lauren who is a dancer.

From 1932 to 1948 he was organist and eventually choirmaster of the Arch Street Presbytarian Church. In 1947, William Schuman offered him a professorship at Juilliard. While at the Juilliard School, Persichetti was devoted to the wind band movement and advocated William Schuman and Peter Mennin to compose pieces for wind band. He was on staff at Juilliard for over forty years. Persichetti's students included Einojuhani Rautavaara, Leonardo Balada, Steven Gellman, Peter Schickele (P.D.Q. Bach), Michael Jeffrey Shapiro, Claire Polin, Toshi Ichiyanagi, Robert Witt (who also studied with Persichetti at the Philadelphia Conservatory), Randell Croley and Philip Glass. He became editorial director of the Elkan-Vogel publishing house in 1952.

Music
Persichetti is one of the major figures in American music of the 20th century, both as a teacher and a composer. Notably, his Hymns and Responses for the Church Year has become a standard setting for church choirs. His numerous compositions for wind ensemble are often introductions to contemporary music for high school and college students. His early style was marked by the influences of Stravinsky, Bartók, Hindemith, and Copland before he developed his distinct voice in the 1950s.

Persichetti's music draws on a wide variety of thought in 20th-century contemporary composition as well as Big Band music. His own style was marked by use of two elements he refers to as "graceful" and "gritty": the former being more lyrical and melodic, the latter being sharp and intensely rhythmic. Especially true of his early compositions, Persichetti said he "liked bumpy melodic lines and was crazy about music that moved along a zigzag path." He frequently used polytonality and pandiatonicism in his writing, and his music could be marked by sharp rhythmic interjections, but his embracing of diverse strands of musical thought makes characterizing his body of work difficult. This trend continued throughout his compositional career. His music lacked sharp changes in style over time. He frequently composed while driving in his car, sometimes taping staff paper to the steering wheel.

His piano music forms the bulk of his creative output, with a concerto, a concertino, twelve sonatas, and a variety of other pieces written for the instrument. These were virtuosic pieces as well as pedagogical and amateur-level compositions. Persichetti was an accomplished pianist. He wrote many pieces suitable for less mature performers, considering them to have serious artistic merit.

Persichetti is also one of the major composers for the concert wind band repertoire, with his 14 works for the ensemble. In 1950, Persichetti composed his first work for band, which was the Divertimento for Band. The Symphony No. 6 for band is of particular note as a standard larger work. This piece boasts complex percussion lines crucial to the work's thematic material as well as utilizes the full spectrum of colors and timbres of the wind band. He wrote one opera, entitled The Sibyl. The music was noted by critics for its color, but the dramatic and vocal aspects of the work were found by some to be lacking.

He wrote nine symphonies, of which the first two were withdrawn, and four string quartets.

Many of his other works are organized into series. One of these, a collection of primarily instrumental works entitled Parables, contains 25 works, many for unaccompanied wind instruments (complete listing below). His 15 Serenades include such unconventional combinations as a trio for trombone, viola, and cello, as well as selections for orchestra, for band, and for duo piano.

During the 1950s, Persichetti was perceived to "truly achieve his own distinctive voice," in the words of Walter G. Simmons. One of Persichetti's most revered compositions is his Concierto for Piano, Four Hands. This duet was first performed at the Pittsburgh International Contemporary Music Festival on November 29, 1952. The piece itself gives the listener the illusion that the two pianists are having a pleasant conversation, without using words, but just musical notes. The duet featured both Vincent and Dorothea Persichetti as the performers. In his review in the Manchester Guardian, Colin Mason stated, "The Concierto for Piano, Four Hands was for me one of the most interesting stimulating American works of the Pittsburgh International Contemporary Music Festival."

Persichetti's esthetic was essentially conservative, a distinctive blend of Classical, Romantic and Modernist elements, contrapuntal, rhythmically charged and expertly scored. His musical imagination was multifaceted and highly virtuosic. "Following the lineage of Mozart, Mendelssohn and Ravel, Persichetti's music suggests the innocence and childlike joy of pure musical creativity", Walter Simmons wrote in the New Grove Dictionary of American Music. "Hence many works for beginners stand, with neither condescension nor apology, alongside more difficult compositions."

Persichetti frequently appeared as a lecturer on college campuses, for which he was noted for his witty and engaging manner. He wrote the noted music theory textbook, Twentieth Century Harmony: Creative Aspects and Practice. He and Flora Rheta Schreiber wrote a monograph on William Schuman.

Persichetti was a big fan of collaboration between music and dance. He encouraged his students at Juilliard to work with the dance program to create compositions for the dancers choreography. Persichetti also collaborated with choreographers professionally. He worked with Martha Graham. He admired her seriousness and her commitment to movement. Persichetti believed that music has to stand on its own and can not be married to dance, one can not depend on the other. He once said, "There isn't such thing as dance music. Music is dance, it's motion."

Persichetti performed many concerts consisting of improvisation. He believed any composer/artist must improvise to create.

Works

Selected works
Celebrations, for Chorus and Wind Ensemble, Op. 103
Chorale Prelude: So Pure the Star, Op. 91
Chorale Prelude: Turn Not Thy Face, Op. 105
Divertimento for Band, Op. 42
Masquerade for Band, Op. 102
Masques for violin and piano Op. 99
Mass for a capella mixed chorus, Op. 84
Pageant, Op. 59
Parable IX for Band, Op. 121
Pastoral for Wind Quintet, Op. 21
Psalm for Band, Op. 53
Symphony No. 6 for Band (1956)
The Hollow Men, for trumpet and string orchestra, Op. 25
The Sibyl: A Parable of Chicken Little (Parable XX): An Opera in One Act, Op. 135
Winter Cantata, Op. 97 for Women's Chorus, Flute, and Marimba

Complete listing of parables 

Parable [I] for Flute, Op. 100 (1965)
Parable II for Brass Quintet, Op. 108 (1968)
Parable III for Oboe, Op. 109 (1968)
Parable IV for Bassoon, Op. 110 (1969)
Parable V for Carillon, Op. 112 (1969)
Parable VI for Organ, Op. 117 (1971)
Parable VII for Harp, Op. 119 (1971)
Parable VIII for Horn, Op. 120 (1972)
Parable IX for Band, Op. 121 (1972)
String Quartet No. 4 (Parable X), Op. 122 (1972)
Parable XI for Alto Saxophone, Op. 123 (1972)
Parable XII for Piccolo, Op. 125 (1973)
Parable XIII for Clarinet, Op. 126 (1973)
Parable XIV for Trumpet, Op. 127 (1975)
Parable XV for English Horn, Op. 128 (1973)
Parable XVI for Viola, Op. 130 (1974)
Parable XVII for Double Bass, Op. 131 (1974)
Parable XVIII for Trombone, Op. 133 (1975)
Parable XIX for Piano, Op. 134 (1975)
The Sibyl: A Parable of Chicken Little (Parable XX): An Opera in One Act, Op. 135
Parable XXI for Guitar, Op. 140 (1978)
Parable XXII for Tuba, Op. 147 (1981)
Parable XXIII for Violin, Cello, and Piano, Op. 150 (1981)
Parable XXIV for Harpsichord, Op. 153 (1982)
Parable XXV for Two Trumpets, Op. 164 (1986)

Poems for piano
Volume 1, Op. 4:
Unroll the flicker's rousing drum (Louis Untermeyer First Words Before Spring)
Soft is the collied night (James Elroy Flecker Fountains)
Gather for festival bright weed and purple shell (William Watson Songs from Cyprus)
Wake subtler dreams, and touch me nigh to tears (William Watson The Frontier)
Ravished lute, sing to her virgin ears (Robert Fitzgerald Song after Campion)
Whose thin fraud I wink at privily (William Watson The Mock Self)
Volume 2, Op. 5:
And warm winds spilled fragrance into her solitudes (Edmond Kowalewski Change)
To whose more clear than crystal voice the frost had joined a crystal spell (Léonie Adams Home Coming)
Sleep, weary mind; dream, heart's desire (Edna St. Vincent Millay There are no islands any more)
Dust in sunlight, and memory in corners (T. S. Eliot A Song for Simeon)
Make me drunken with deep red torrents of joy (John Gould Fletcher Autumnal Clouds)
Volume 3, Op. 14:
Rear its frondings sighing in aetherial folds (Hart Crane Royal Palm)
Listen! Can you hear the antic melody of fear those two anxious feet are playing? (Walter Prude)
Puffed out and marching upon a blue sky (Amy Lowell Lilacs)
And hunged like those top jewels of the night (Léonie Adams Twilit Revelation)
Each gay dunce shall lend a hand (John Trumbull The Country Clown)

List of selected works
Concertino for Piano, op.16, 1941
Symphony no.1, op.18, 1942
Symphony no.2, op.19, 1942
Dance Overture, op.20, 1942
Fables, op.23, 1943
The Hollow Men, op.25, 1944
Symphony no.3, op.30, 1946
Serenade no.5, op.43, 1950
Fairy Tale, op.48, 195
Symphony no.4, op.51, 1951
Symphony for Strings (Sym. no.5), op.61, 1953
Symphony no.7 ‘Liturgical’, op.80, 1958
Piano Concerto, op.90, 1962
Introit, op.96, 1964
Symphony no.8, op.106, 1967
Symphony no.9 ‘Sinfonia janiculum’, op.113, 1970
Night Dances, op.114, 1970
A Lincoln Address, op.124, 1972, originally written for Nixon's 2nd inauguration, incorporating text from Lincoln's 2nd inaugural address, but pulled from the program. Later premiered January 25, 1973 by Walter Susskind and the St. Louis Symphony with narration by William Warfield.
Concerto for English Horn and Strings, op.137, 1977
Band:
Divertimento, op.42, 1950
Psalm, op.53, 1952
Pageant, op.59, 1953
Symphony for Band (Sym. no.6), op.69, 1956
Serenade no.11, op.85, 1960
Bagatelles, op.87, 1961
So Pure the Star, chorale prelude, op.91, 1962
Masquerade, op.102, 1965
Turn not thy Face, chorale prelude, op.105, 1966
O Cool is the Valley (Poem for Band), op.118, 1971
A Lincoln Address, op.124a, nar, band, 1973
O God Unseen, chorale prelude, op.160, 1984
Vocal
Choral:
Magnificat and Nunc Dimittis, op.8, SATB, pf, 1940
Canons, op.31, SSAA/TTBB/SATB, 1947
2 Cummings Choruses (e.e. cummings), op.33, 2vv, pf, 1948
I. jimmie's got a goil
II. sam was a man
Proverb, op.34, SATB, 1948
2 Cummings Choruses, op.46, SSAA, 1950
I. hist whist
II. this is the garden
Hymns and Responses for the Church Year (W.H. Auden, Dickinson, Milton, Shakespeare, Psalms, Shelley, and others), op.68, 1955, originally a commission for a single hymn by Carleton Sprague Smith for Smith's collection American Hymns.
Seek the Highest (F. Adler), op.78, SAB, pf, 1957
Song of Peace (anon.), op.82, TTBB/SATB, pf, 1959
Mass, op.84, SATB, 1960
Stabat mater, op.92, SATB, orch, 1963
Te Deum, op.93, SATB, orch, 1963
Spring Cantata (Cummings), op.94, SSAA, pf, 1963
Winter Cantata (11 Haiku), op.97, SSAA, fl, mar, 1964
4 Cummings Choruses, op.98, 2vv, pf, 1964
I. dominic has a doll
II. nouns to nouns
III. maggie and millie and molly and may
IV. uncles
Celebrations (cant., W. Whitman), op.103, SATB, wind ens, 1966
The Pleiades (cant., Whitman), op.107, SATB, tpt, str, 1967
The Creation (Persichetti), op.111, S, A, T, Bar, SATB, orch, 1969;
Love (Bible: Corinthians), op.116, SSAA, 1971
Glad and Very (Cummings), op.129, 2vv, 1974
Flower Songs (Cant. no.6) (Cummings), op.157, SATB, str, 1983
Hymns and Responses for the Church Year, vol. 2, op.166, 1987
Solo:
e.e. cummings Songs, op.26, 1945, unpublished
2 Chinese Songs, op.29, 1945
3 English Songs (17th century), op.49, 1951, unpublished
Harmonium (W. Stevens), song cycle, op.50, S, pf, 1951
Sara Teasdale Songs, op.72, 1957, unpublished
Carl Sandburg Songs, op.73, 1957, unpublished
James Joyce Songs, op.74, 1957
Hilaire Belloc Songs, op.75, 1957
Robert Frost Songs, op.76, 1957, unpublished
Emily Dickinson Songs, op.77, 1957
A Net of Fireflies (Jap., trans. H. Steward), song cycle, op.115, 1970
Chamber and Solo Instrumental
3 or more instruments:
Serenade no.1, op.1, 10 wind, 1929
Str Qt no.1, op.7, 1939
Concertato, op.12, piano quintet, 1940
Serenade no.3, op.17, violin, cello, piano, 1941
Pastoral, op.21, woodwind quintet, 1943
String Quartet no.2, op.24, 1944
King Lear, op.35, woodwind quintet, timpani, piano, 1948
Serenade no.6, op.44, trombone, viola, cello, 1950
Piano Quintet, op.66, 1954
String Quartet no.3, op.81, 1959
1–2 instruments:
Suite, op.9, violin, cello, 1940, unpublished
Sonata, op.10, violin, 1940
Fantasy, op.15, violin, piano, 1941, unpublished
Vocalise, op.27, cello, piano, 1945
Serenade no.4, op.28, violin, piano, 1945
Sonata, op.54, cello, 1952
Little Recorder Book, op.70, 1956
Serenade no.9, op.71, 2 recorder, 1956
Serenade no.10, op.79, flute, harp, 1957
Infanta marina, op.83, viola, piano, 1960
Serenade no.12, op.88, tuba, 1961
Serenade no.13, op.95, 2 clarinets, 1963
Masques, op.99, violin, piano, 1965
Serenade no.14, op.159, oboe, 1984
Keyboard
Piano:
Serenade no.2, op.2, 1929
Sonata no.1, op.3, 1939
Poems, vols.1–2, opp.4–5, 1939
Sonata no.2, op.6, 1939
Sonata, op.13, 2 pianos, 1940
Poems, vol. 3, op.14, 1941
Sonata no.3, op.22, 1943
Variations for an Album, op.32, 1947
Sonata no.4, op.36, 1949
Sonata no.5, op.37, 1949
Sonatina no.1, op.38, 1950
Sonata no.6, op.39, 1950
Sonata no.7, op.40, 1950
Sonata no.8, op.41, 1950
Sonatina no.2, op.45, 1950
Sonatina no.3, op.47, 1950
Serenade no.7, op.55, 1952
Concerto, op.56, 4 hands, 1952
Parades, op.57, 1952
Sonata no.9, op.58, 1952;
Little Piano Book, op.60, 1953
Serenade no.8, op.62, 4 hands, 1954
Sonatina no.4, op.63, 1954
Sonatina no.5, op.64, 1954
Sonatina no.6, op.65, 1954
Sonata no.10, op.67, 1955
Sonata no.11, op.101, 1965
Little Mirror Book, op.139, 1978
Reflective Studies, op.138, 1978
4 Arabesques, op.141, 1978
3 Toccatinas, op.142, 1979
Mirror Etudes, op.143, 1979
Sonata no.12, op.145, 1980
Winter Solstice, op.165, 1986
Other:
Sonatine, op.11, organ pedals, 1940
Harpsichord Sonata no.1, op.52, 1951
Sonata for Organ, op.86, 1960, commissioned by the St. Louis chapter of the AGO, premiered by Rudolph Kremer at the AGO chapter's 50th anniversary concert.
Shimah b'koli, op.89, organ, 1962
Drop, Drop Slow Tears, chorale prelude, op.104, organ, 1966
Do Not Go Gentle, op.132, organ pedals, 1974
Auden Variations, op.136, organ, 1977, commissioned by the Hartt College of Music for organist Leonard Raver, premiered by Raver at Hartt's International Contemporary Organ Music Festival on July 14, 1978.
Dryden Liturgical Suite, op.144, organ, 1979, commissioned by the University of Michigan's Marilyn Mason Commissioning Fund, dedicated to Marilyn Mason, premiered by Mason on June 1980 at the AGO's national convention in Minneapolis.
Harpsichord Sonata no.2, op.146, 1981
Song of David, op.148, org, 1981
Harpsichord Sonata no.3, op.149, 1981
Harpsichord Sonata no.4, op.151, 1982
Harpsichord Sonata no.5, op.152, 1982
Harpsichord Sonata no.6, op.154, 1982
Little Hpd Book, op.155, 1983
Harpsichord Sonata no.7, op.156, 1983
Harpsichord Sonata no.8, op.158, 1984
Serenade no.15, op.161, harpsichord, 1984
Give Peace, O God, chorale prelude, op.162, organ, 1985
Harpsichord Sonata no.9, op.163, 1985

Awards and honors
In honor of Persichetti's influence on American music, on May 19, 1984, he was awarded the University of Pennsylvania Glee Club Award of Merit. Beginning in 1964, this award "established to bring a declaration of appreciation to an individual each year that has made a significant contribution to the world of music and helped to create a climate in which our talents may find valid expression."
Persichetti was an honorary brother of the Delta Eta chapter of Phi Mu Alpha Sinfonia at Youngstown State University. He was initiated into the fraternity on April 1, 1961.
Persichetti was an honorary brother of the Omicron chapter of Kappa Kappa Psi at West Virginia University. He was initiated into the fraternity on November 17, 1967.

References

Further reading
Bell, Larry. Review of Vincent Persichetti: The Louisville Orchestra for Sequenza21.com 
Burleson, Geoffrey "Vincent Persichetti and the Piano Sonata". Liner notes to Vincent Persichetti: Complete Piano Sonatas. New World Records.
Cassaro, James P. "Persichetti, Vincent". Grove Music Online
 Minut, Mirabella A. Style and Compositional Techniques in Vincent Persichetti's Ten Sonatas for Harpsichord. DMA diss. Muncie: Ball State University, 2009.
Morris, Donald. The Life of Vincent Persichetti, With Emphasis on His Works for Band. PhD dissertation, Florida State University, 1991.
Patterson, Donald L., and Janet L. Patterson. Vincent Persichetti: A Bio-Biography. Westport, Connecticut: Greenwood Press, 1988.

Olmstead, Andrea. Vincent Persichetti: Grazioso, Grit, and Gold. New York, NY: Roman and Littlefield, 2018.
Simmons, Walter. The Music of William Schuman, Vincent Persichetti, and Peter Mennin: Voices of Stone and Steel. Lanham, Maryland: Scarecrow Press, 2011. .
Simmons, Walter G. "Persichetti, Vincent". Grove Music Online

External links
Vincent Persichetti's page, Carl Fischer
Vincent Persichetti's page, Theodore Presser Company
Vincent Persichetti papers, 1901–1996 Music Division, New York Public Library
Vincent Persichetti collection of noncommercial recordings, 1940–1987 Music Division, New York Public Library
Dorothea Flanagan Persichetti scrapbook, 1925–1941 Music Division, New York Public Library
Unsung Songs, discussion of Emily Dickinson songs, Opus 77, by Vincent Persichetti
Persichetti information and trivia, bandroom.com
List of works, ArkivMusic
Vincent Persichetti Society
Vincent Persichetti Music Association

Interviews
Vincent Persichetti interview by Bruce Duffie, November 15, 1986
David Dubal interview with Vincent Persichetti, WNCN-FM, June 3, 1984
Interview with Tim Page, WNYC, May 12, 1987

Listening
Art of the States: Vincent Persichetti Night Dances, op. 114 (1970)

1915 births
1987 deaths
20th-century American composers
20th-century American male musicians
20th-century classical composers
American classical composers
American male classical composers
American people of Italian descent
Classical musicians from Pennsylvania
Combs College of Music alumni
Composers for carillon
Concert band composers
Curtis Institute of Music alumni
Juilliard School faculty
Musicians from Philadelphia
Pupils of Fritz Reiner
South Philadelphia High School alumni
University of the Arts (Philadelphia) alumni
University of the Arts (Philadelphia) faculty